Elias ben Ḥayyim Cohen Höchheimer (or Hechim) was an eighteenth century Jewish astronomer and mathematician.

Born in Hochheim, Höchheimer lived a long time in Hildburghausen and died in Amsterdam. He was the author of Shebile di-Reḳi'a (Prague, 1784), on trigonometry and astronomy, Sefer Yalde ha-Zeman (Prague, 1786), a commentary on Jedaiah Bedersi's Beḥinat ha-'Olam, and two German-language textbooks on arithmetic.

References

 Allg. Zeit. des Jud. xliv. 652.
 Fürst, Bibl. Jud. i. 367, 402.
 Jac. Zwarts, Het verblijf van Prins Willem V ten huize van den joodschen tabaksplanter Benjamin Cohen (Utrecht 1921), p. 16.
 

18th-century German mathematicians
Mathematicians from Prague
18th-century Jews